Virādha (Sanskrit: विराध, Tamil: Viratan, Thai: Phirap, Malay: Purbaita) is minor character from the Aranya Kanda of the Ramayana. He is a rakshasa living in Dandaka forest who briefly kidnaps Sita in an episode that has been described as "strongly [prefiguring Sita's] later abduction by Ravana, the central event of the book and the pivotal event of the epic." Rama and Lakshmana begin to battle the monster, but though they shoot it with many arrows, the arrows pass straight through him and leave him unharmed (Aranyakanda, Sarga 3). The monster reveals that he has a boon from Brahma which makes him invincible to weapons. So the brothers kill the rakshasa by first breaking his arms, then burying him alive in a grave. When the monsters arms are broken, he begins to praise the brothers for liberating him: he had, in a previous life, been a celestial being named Tumburu, and had been cursed by Kubera to live as a fearsome monster until he be killed by Rama. The brothers bury him, and he apparently goes back to his former celestial abode.

References

Rakshasa in the Ramayana